Jessie Alice Tandy (7 June 1909 – 11 September 1994) was a British-American actress. Tandy appeared in over 100 stage productions and had more than 60 roles in film and TV, receiving an Academy Award, four Tony Awards, a BAFTA, a Golden Globe Award, and a Primetime Emmy Award. She acted as Blanche DuBois in the original Broadway production of A Streetcar Named Desire in 1948. Her films included Alfred Hitchcock's The Birds and The Gin Game. At 80, she became the oldest actress to receive the Academy Award for Best Actress for her role in Driving Miss Daisy.

Early life
The youngest of three siblings, Tandy was born in Geldeston Road in Hackney, London to Harry Tandy and his wife, Jessie Helen Horspool. Her mother was from a large fenland family in Wisbech, Cambridgeshire, and the head of a school for mentally handicapped children, and her father was a travelling salesman for a rope manufacturer. She was educated at Dame Alice Owen's School in Islington.

Her father died when she was 12, and her mother subsequently taught evening courses to earn an income. Her brother Edward was later a prisoner of war of the Japanese in Asia.

Acting career

Tandy was 18 years old when she made her professional debut on the London stage in 1927. During the 1930s, she acted in many plays in London's West End, playing Ophelia (opposite John Gielgud's legendary Hamlet) and Katherine (opposite Laurence Olivier's Henry V).

She entered films in Britain, but after her marriage to Jack Hawkins failed, she moved to the United States hoping to find better roles. During her time as a leading actress on the stage in London, she often had to fight over roles with her two rivals, Peggy Ashcroft and Celia Johnson. In the following years, she played supporting roles in several Hollywood films. 

Like many stage actors, Tandy also worked in radio. Among other programs, she was a regular on Mandrake the Magician (as Princess Narda), and then with her second husband Hume Cronyn in The Marriage which ran on radio from 1953 to 1954, and then segued onto television. 

She made her American film debut in The Seventh Cross (1944). She had supporting appearances in The Valley of Decision (1945), The Green Years (1946, as Cronyn's daughter), Dragonwyck (1946) starring Gene Tierney and Vincent Price and Forever Amber (1947).
She appeared as the insomniac murderess in A Woman's Vengeance (1948), a film noir adapted by Aldous Huxley from his short story "The Gioconda Smile".

Over the next three decades, her film career continued sporadically while she found better roles on the stage. Her roles during this time included The Desert Fox: The Story of Rommel (1951) opposite James Mason, The Light in the Forest (1958), and a role as a domineering mother in Alfred Hitchcock's film, The Birds (1963).

On Broadway, she won a Tony Award for her performance as Blanche Dubois in the original Broadway production of A Streetcar Named Desire in 1948. After this (she lost the film role to actress Vivien Leigh), she concentrated on the stage. In 1976, she and Cronyn joined the acting company of the Stratford Festival, and returned in 1980 to debut Cronyn's play Foxfire. In 1977, she earned her second Tony Award, for her performance (with Cronyn) in The Gin Game and her third Tony in 1982 for her performance, again with Cronyn, in Foxfire.

The beginning of the 1980s saw a resurgence in her film career, with character roles in The World According to Garp, Best Friends, Still of the Night (all 1982) and The Bostonians (1984). She and Cronyn were now working together more regularly on stage and television, including the films Cocoon (1985), *batteries not included (1987) and Cocoon: The Return (1988) and the Emmy Award winning television film Foxfire (1987, recreating her Tony winning Broadway role).

However, it was her colourful performance in Driving Miss Daisy (1989), as an aging, stubborn Southern Jewish matron, that earned her an Oscar.

She received a Best Supporting Actress nomination for her work in the grassroots hit Fried Green Tomatoes (1991) and co-starred in The Story Lady (1991 TV film, with her daughter Tandy Cronyn), Used People (1992, as Shirley MacLaine's mother), television film To Dance with the White Dog (1993, with Cronyn), Camilla (1994, with Cronyn). Nobody's Fool (1994) proved to be her last performance, at the age of 84.

Other awards
Tandy was chosen by People magazine as one of the 50 Most Beautiful People in the world in 1990.

1979 – Induction into the American Theatre Hall of Fame
1979 – Sarah Siddons Award Chicago theatre
1986 – Drama Desk Special Award
1986 – Kennedy Center Honors Recipient
1990 – National Medal of Arts
1991 – Women in Film Crystal Award
1994 – Special Tony Award for Lifetime Achievement shared with her husband, Hume Cronyn

Personal life and death

In 1932 Tandy married English actor Jack Hawkins and together they had a daughter, Susan Hawkins. Susan became an actress and was the daughter-in-law of John Moynihan Tettemer, a former Passionist monk who authored I Was a Monk: The Autobiography of John Tettemer, and was cast in small roles in Lost Horizon and Meet John Doe. 

Tandy and Hawkins divorced in 1940. She married Canadian actor Hume Cronyn in 1942. Prior to moving to Connecticut, she and Cronyn lived for many years in nearby Pound Ridge, New York, and they remained together until her death in 1994. They had two children, daughter Tandy Cronyn, an actress who would co-star with her mother in the TV film The Story Lady, and son Christopher Cronyn. Jessica Tandy became a naturalized citizen of the US in 1952. 

In 1990, Jessica Tandy was diagnosed with ovarian cancer, and she also suffered from angina and glaucoma. Despite her illnesses and age she continued working.  On September 11, 1994, she died at home in Easton, Connecticut, at the age of 85.

Work

U.S. stage credits

Filmography

†Re-issued on DVD as The Christmas Story Lady

Television

References

External links

 
 
 
 Movie Magazine International Tribute
 Lifetime Honors – National Medal of Arts
 Obituary—The New York Times, 12 September 1994
 Katharine Cronyn Harley fonds (R11163) at Library and Archives Canada. The fonds includes many records related to Jessica Tandy and Hume Cronyn.

1909 births
1994 deaths
20th-century American actresses
20th-century British actresses
Actresses from London
Best Actress Academy Award winners
Best Actress BAFTA Award winners
Best Musical or Comedy Actress Golden Globe (film) winners
David di Donatello winners
Deaths from cancer in Connecticut
Deaths from ovarian cancer
Drama Desk Award winners
British emigrants to the United States
Kennedy Center honorees
Outstanding Performance by a Lead Actress in a Miniseries or Movie Primetime Emmy Award winners
People educated at Dame Alice Owen's School
People from Hackney Central
Special Tony Award recipients
Tony Award winners
United States National Medal of Arts recipients
People from Easton, Connecticut